Michael Brune (born 24 August 1971) became the youngest executive director of the Sierra Club at 38, an American environmental organization founded by preservationist John Muir, UC professor of botany Willis Linn Jepson, and attorney Warren Olney in 1892. He was hired by the 15 member board of directors to his position in January 2010, after Carl Pope was fired.

Prior to the Sierra Club, Brune was the executive director of the Rainforest Action Network for seven years. He also worked as an organizer for Greenpeace.

In 1999, while working at the Rainforest Action Network, Brune ran a successful campaign to get Home Depot stores to stop purchasing and selling wood from old-growth forests. Time magazine listed this as its top environmental story of that year.

Brune is a regular contributor to the Huffington Post, a progressive website founded by Arianna Huffington, as well as  Daily Kos.

In 2008 he published a book called Coming Clean -- Breaking America's Addiction to Oil and Coal.

In 2014 Brune was confirmed as the Hillary Institute of International Leadership's Hillary Laureate in recognition of his work on climate change issues. He was then awarded, jointly with Amazon Watch's Atossa Soltani, the four yearly Hillary Step prize.

In August 2021 the Sierra Club announced that Brune was resigning as executive director, effective as of the end of the year.

References

External links
Michael Brune's blog at Huffington Post
Bio of Michael Brune at the Sierra Club

Sierra Club executive directors
Living people
American environmentalists
American non-fiction environmental writers
1971 births